Varangu may refer to several places in Estonia:
Varangu, Haljala Parish, village in Lääne-Viru County, Estonia
Varangu, Väike-Maarja Parish, village in Lääne-Viru County, Estonia